Edmund of England may refer to:

 Edmund I of England (921–946), King of the English, also known as Edmund the Elder
 Edmund Ironside (died 1016), King of the English, also known as Edmund II
 Edmund of Langley, 1st Duke of York (1341–1402), son of King Edward III of England
 Edmund Tudor, Duke of Somerset (1499–1500), son of King Henry VII of England